The Schulz-Zimm distribution is a special case of the gamma distribution. It is widely used to model the polydispersity of polymers. In this context it has been introduced in 1939 by Günter Victor Schulz and in 1948 by Bruno H. Zimm.

This distribution has only a shape parameter k, the scale being fixed at θ=1/k. Accordingly, the probability density function is

When applied to polymers, the variable x is the relative mass or chain length . Accordingly, the mass distribution  is just a gamma distribution with scale parameter . This explains why the Schulz-Zimm distribution is unheard of outside its conventional application domain.

The distribution has mean 1 and variance 1/k.

For large k the Schulz-Zimm distribution approaches a Gaussian distribution. In algorithms where one needs to draw samples , the Schulz-Zimm distribution is to be preferred over a Gaussian because the latter requires an arbitrary cut-off to prevent negative x.

References

Continuous distributions